Sibiti Bridge is a bridge in Tanzania which links Iramba with Shinyanga Region.

References

Buildings and structures under construction in Tanzania
Bridges in Tanzania